Now That's What I Call Music! 53 is the 53rd edition of the Now! series in the United States. It was released on February 3, 2015. It features 21 tracks including the Billboard Hot 100 number-one hit "Uptown Funk".

Now 53 debuted at number 2 on the Billboard 200 chart with 99,000 copies sold in its first week. As of July 2015, the compilation has sold 451,000 copies. It became the first album in history to miss the top position of the Billboard 200 despite being the best-selling album of the week.

Track listing

Reception

According to Andy Kellman of AllMusic, the number-one song, "Uptown Funk", leads the way in this compilation of hits from late 2014/early 2015 "followed by a succession of singles that fared either nearly or just as well."

Charts

Weekly charts

Year-end charts

References

External links

2015 compilation albums
 053